David Ayer (born January 18 , 1968) is an American filmmaker known for making crime films that are set in Los Angeles and deal with gangs and police corruption. His screenplays include Training Day (2001), The Fast and the Furious (2001), and S.W.A.T. (2003). He has also directed Harsh Times (2005), Street Kings (2008), End of Watch (2012), and Sabotage (2014). In 2016, he directed the superhero film Suicide Squad from the DC Extended Universe, and then the urban fantasy film Bright (2017) for Netflix. He has twice collaborated with actor Shia LaBeouf: first with the World War II drama Fury (2014), then the crime thriller The Tax Collector (2020). He has also collaborated with his friend Cle Shaheed Sloan who has appeared in four of his films.

Early life
Ayer was born in Champaign, Illinois, on January 18, 1968, and grew up in Bloomington, Minnesota, and Bethesda, Maryland, where he was kicked out of his house by his parents as a teenager. Ayer lived with his cousin in Los Angeles, California, where his experiences in South Central Los Angeles became the inspiration for many of his films. Ayer dropped out of high school and painted houses for a living. Ayer enlisted in the United States Navy as a submarine sonar technician (STS) aboard the USS Haddo (SSN-604)

Career
Ayer's screenplay, U-571 was based on his experiences as a submariner in the US Navy. Ayer collaborated on the screenplay for The Fast and the Furious in 2001. Ayer wrote the screenplay for crime drama Dark Blue, and it was his research into the Los Angeles Police Department that led to his most prominent screenplay, Training Day. Ayer signed a contract to write a screenplay for S.W.A.T., which was based on his original story pitch. The film was directed by Clark Johnson and released in 2003.

In 2006, screenwriter David Ayer admitted that U-571 had distorted history, and said that he would not do it again. He told BBC Radio 4's The Film Programme that he "did not feel good" about suggesting that Americans, rather than the British, had captured the naval Enigma cipher: "It was a distortion ... a mercenary decision ... to create this parallel history in order to drive the film for an American audience. Both my grandparents were officers in the Second World War, and I would be personally offended if somebody distorted their achievements."

Ayer's directorial debut was with the film Harsh Times, an action-drama set on the streets of South Central Los Angeles, showing how drug use and past military experiences affects people's attempts to lead normal lives. He went on to direct the action thriller Street Kings, which was released in 2008.

Ayer later wrote and directed End of Watch, an action thriller about the daily lives of two South Central Los Angeles policemen, played by Jake Gyllenhaal and Michael Peña. The film was released in the fall of 2012 to profitable box-office returns and favorable reception from critics, with Roger Ebert naming it as the fourth-best film of 2012, hailing it as "one of the best police movies in recent years". His next film was the action thriller Sabotage, starring Arnold Schwarzenegger; the film was released on March 28, 2014. He wrote and directed the World War II-set action film, Fury, starring Brad Pitt, Shia LaBeouf and Logan Lerman; the film was released in October 2014.

Ayer wrote and directed the film adaptation of the comic book Suicide Squad, which was released on August 5, 2016. The film, along with Ayer's directing, received negative reviews, though it became his most commercially successful film to date.

Ayer also directed Bright, "a contemporary cop thriller, but with fantastical elements", starring Will Smith and Joel Edgerton with a script penned by Max Landis that Ayer rewrote. Netflix picked up the film for a $90 million deal. The film was released on December 22, 2017. On January 3, 2018, Netflix confirmed they were moving ahead with the sequel for Bright, with Smith and Edgerton reprising their roles and Ayer directing and writing the script with Evan Spiliotopoulos, the filming of which began in March 2019.
This ultimately did not happen due to Will Smith's schedule, and on May 5, 2020, he was replaced with Louise Leterrier as David Ayer wanted to focus on The Dirty Dozen for Warner Brothers.

On December 13, 2016, Ayer was brought on board to direct the spin-off of Suicide Squad, Gotham City Sirens, which evolved into  Birds of Prey, directed by Cathy Yan, and starring Margot Robbie reprising her role of Harley Quinn. Gotham City Sirens remained in development, but as of April 2021, Gotham City Sirens has been put on pause.

He was also contracted by Universal Pictures to direct a remake of Scarface starring Diego Luna, but was let go because his script was too violent.

Ayer established Cedar Park Entertainment on January 4, 2018, with former head of programming at Audience Network, Chris Long. Primarily established to produce films and television shows, the first film Cedar Park produced was 2020's The Tax Collector, Ayer's second collaboration with actor Shia LaBeouf. On June 21, 2018, it set a first look deal with Entertainment One, and it will cover television series, both scripted and unscripted.

In May 2022, Ayer signed on to direct action thriller The Beekeeper for Miramax, written by Kurt Wimmer and starring Jason Statham, with Metro-Goldwyn-Mayer later acquiring domestic distribution rights.

Filmography

Film

Cameo roles

Television

Other roles

References

External links
 

1968 births
American male screenwriters
Film directors from Illinois
Film directors from Maryland
Film directors from Minnesota
Living people
People from Bethesda, Maryland
People from Bloomington, Minnesota
People from Champaign, Illinois
United States Navy sailors
Action film directors
Writers from Los Angeles
Science fiction film directors
Film directors from Los Angeles
Screenwriters from California
Screenwriters from Illinois
Screenwriters from Minnesota
Screenwriters from Maryland
American Christians